Waldenström hyperglobulinemic purpura  is a skin condition that presents with episodic showers of petechiae (small red or purple spots) occurring on all parts of the body, most profusely on the lower extremities.

See also 
 Skin lesion

References 

Vascular-related cutaneous conditions